Cherry Grove is a census-designated place (CDP) in Anderson Township, Hamilton County, Ohio, United States. The population was 4,419 at the 2020 census.

Geography
Cherry Grove is located at  (39.080529, -84.318713).

Demographics

At the 2000 census there were 4,555 people, 1,524 households, and 1,342 families living in the CDP. The population density was 4,038.2 people per square mile (1,556.4/km). There were 1,545 housing units at an average density of 1,369.7/sq mi (527.9/km).  The racial makeup of the CDP was 96.07% White, 1.19% African American, 0.09% Native American, 1.65% Asian, 0.09% Pacific Islander, 0.40% from other races, and 0.53% from two or more races. Hispanic or Latino of any race were 0.94%.

Of the 1,524 households 44.6% had children under the age of 18 living with them, 76.8% were married couples living together, 8.8% had a female householder with no husband present, and 11.9% were non-families. 10.3% of households were one person and 3.9% were one person aged 65 or older. The average household size was 2.99 and the average family size was 3.21.

The age distribution was 30.0% under the age of 18, 6.8% from 18 to 24, 27.9% from 25 to 44, 25.4% from 45 to 64, and 10.0% 65 or older. The median age was 37 years. For every 100 females, there were 93.7 males. For every 100 females age 18 and over, there were 91.5 males.

The median household income was $65,486 and the median family income  was $68,365. Males had a median income of $45,357 versus $31,833 for females. The per capita income for the CDP was $23,706. About 0.5% of families and 0.5% of the population were below the poverty line, including none of those under age 18 and 1.7% of those age 65 or over.

References

Census-designated places in Hamilton County, Ohio
Census-designated places in Ohio